Max Cole (30 January 1941 – 25 February 2018) was an Australian rules footballer who played with Fitzroy in the Victorian Football League (VFL).

Notes

External links 		
		

		
				
1941 births
2018 deaths
Australian rules footballers from Victoria (Australia)		
Fitzroy Football Club players
Dandenong Football Club players